Papun is a town in Kayin State, Myanmar. It is on the east side of the Yunzalin River. It was formerly one of the headquarters of the Karen National Union and the Karen National Liberation Army. The Papun Airport is also located nearby.

References

External links
 Papun Map—Satellite Images of Papun, Maplandia.com]

Populated places in Kayin State
Township capitals of Myanmar